The Welland Canal is a ship canal in Ontario, Canada, connecting Lake Ontario and Lake Erie. It forms a key section of the St. Lawrence Seaway and Great Lakes Waterway. Traversing the Niagara Peninsula from Port Weller in St. Catharines to Port Colborne, it enables ships to ascend and descend the Niagara Escarpment and bypass Niagara Falls.  It is the fourth canal connecting these waterways; three smaller predecessors also bore the same name.

It was a major factor in the growth of the city of Toronto, Ontario. The original canal and its successors allowed goods from Great Lakes ports such as Cleveland, Detroit, Milwaukee, and Chicago, as well as other heavily industrialized areas of the United States and Ontario, to be shipped to the Port of Montreal or to Quebec City, where they were usually reloaded onto ocean-going vessels for international shipping.

The Welland Canal in use today is the Fourth Welland Canal. The Second Welland Canal was completed in 1845 and remained in operation for nearly a century before closing permanently in 1935. The Third Welland Canal was designed to follow a straighter and thus shorter route than the first two and began construction in 1872 through 1887. The canal permitted access to larger ships with the Third Canal operating from 1887 until 1935 along with the still operating Second Welland Canal. The Fourth Welland Canal began construction in 1913 and was completed in 1932 with a delay due to World War I consuming vital manpower and materials. Three years after the Fourth Canal began operating in 1932 the government of Canada closed the Second and Third canals which required costly upkeep as they were deemed redundant. The Fourth Canal is equipped with just eight locks compared to the forty locks needed by the First Welland Canal.
  
The Welland Canal eclipsed other, narrower canals in the region, such as the Trent-Severn Waterway and, significantly, the Erie Canal (which linked the Atlantic and Lake Erie via New York City and Buffalo, New York) by providing a shorter, more direct connection to Lake Erie.

The southern, Lake Erie terminus of the canal is  higher than the northern terminus on Lake Ontario. The canal includes eight  ship locks.

All other highway or railroad crossings of the Welland Canal are either movable bridges (of the vertical lift or bascule bridge types) or tunnels. It takes ships an average of about eleven hours to traverse the entire length of the Welland Canal.

History

Before the digging of the Welland Canal, shipping traffic between Lake Ontario and Lake Erie used a portage road between Chippawa, Ontario, and Queenston, Ontario, which are both located on the Niagara River—above and below Niagara Falls, respectively.

First Welland Canal

The Welland Canal Company was incorporated by the Province of Upper Canada, in 1824, after a petition by nine "freeholders of the District of Niagara". One of the petitioners was William Hamilton Merritt, who was in part looking to provide a regular flow of water for his many water-powered industries along the Twelve Mile Creek in Thorold. The construction began at Allanburg, Ontario, on November 30, at a point now marked as such on the west end of Bridge No. 11 (formerly Highway 20). This canal opened for a trial run on November 30, 1829. After a short ceremony at Lock One, in Port Dalhousie, the schooner Anne & Jane (also called "Annie & Jane" in some texts) made the first transit, upbound to Buffalo, N.Y., with Merritt as a passenger on her deck.

The first canal ran from Port Dalhousie, Ontario, on Lake Ontario south along Twelve Mile Creek to St. Catharines. From there it took a winding route up the Niagara Escarpment through Merritton, Ontario, to Thorold, where it continued south via Allanburg to Port Robinson, Ontario, on the Welland River. Ships went east (downstream) on the Welland River to Chippawa, at the south (upper) end of the old portage road, where they made a sharp right turn into the Niagara River, upstream towards Lake Erie. Originally, the section between Allanburg and Port Robinson was planned to be carried in a tunnel. However, the sandy soil in this part of Ontario made a tunnel infeasible, and a deep open-cut canal was dug instead.

A southern extension from Port Robinson opened in 1833, with the founding of Port Colborne. This extension followed the Welland River south to Welland (known then as the settlement of Aqueduct, for the wooden aqueduct that carried the canal over the Welland River at that point), and then split to run south to Port Colborne on Lake Erie. A feeder canal ran southwest from Welland to another point on Lake Erie, just west of Rock Point Provincial Park in Port Maitland. With the opening of the extension, the canal stretched  between the two lakes, with 40 wooden locks.

Deterioration of the wood used in the 40 locks and the increasing size of ships led to demand for the Second Welland Canal, which used cut stone locks, within just a few years.

Second Welland Canal

In 1839 the government of Upper Canada approved the purchase of shares in the private canal company in response to the company's continuing financial problems in the face of the continental financial panic of 1837. The public buyout was completed in 1841, and work began to deepen the canal and to reduce the number of locks to 27, each .

Competition came in 1854 with the opening of the Erie and Ontario Railway, running parallel to the original portage road. In 1859, the Welland Railway opened, parallel to the canal and with the same endpoints. But this railway was affiliated with the canal, and was actually used to help transfer cargoes from the lake ships, which were too large for the small canal locks, to the other end of the canal (The Trillium Railway owns the railway's remnants and Port Colborne Harbour Railway). Smaller ships called "canallers" also took a part of these loads. Due to this problem, it was soon apparent the canal would have to be enlarged again.

Third Welland Canal

In 1887, a new shorter alignment was completed between St. Catharines and Port Dalhousie. One of the most interesting features of this third Welland Canal was the Merritton Tunnel, built in 1876 on the Grand Trunk Railway line that ran under the canal between Locks 18 and 19. Another nearby tunnel carried the canal over a sunken section of the St David's Road. Even so, the canal was still too small for many boats.

Fourth (current) Welland Canal

Construction on the current canal began in 1913, but work was put on hold from 1916 to 1919 due to a shortage of men and workers during World War I (1914–18) and was completed and officially opened on August 6, 1932. Dredging to the planned 25 foot depth was not completed until 1935. The route was again changed north of St. Catharines, now running directly north to Port Weller. In this configuration, there are eight locks, seven at the Niagara Escarpment and the eighth, a guard lock, at Port Colborne to adjust with the varying water depth in Lake Erie. This canal is officially known now as the Welland Ship Canal. The Welland Canal's first "hands-free" vacuum mooring was tested in Lock 7 prior to 2014. The installation of the updated systems for Locks 1 through 7 was originally set to be completed in 2017, but the project wasn't finished until early 2018 after unforeseen delays.

Welland By-Pass
All three crossings of the new alignment—one an aqueduct for the Welland River—were built as tunnels. Around the same time, the Thorold Tunnel was built at Thorold and several bridges were removed.

Proposed Fifth Welland Canal
These projects were to be tied into a proposed new canal, titled the Fifth Welland Canal, which was planned to by-pass most of the existing canal to the east and to cross the Niagara Escarpment in four twinned "Panamax" locks. While land for the project was expropriated and early designs initiated, the project never got past early planning or construction stages and has since been shelved.

The present Welland Ship Canal was originally designed to only last until 2030, almost 100 years after it first opened, and 200 years since the first full shipping season, in 1830, of the original canal. Subsequent improvements to the canal infrastructure mean that it may last much longer before it needs to be replaced.

Accidents
On June 20, 1912, the government survey steamer La Canadienne lost control due to mechanical problems in the engine room and smashed into the upstream gates of Lock No. 22 of the 3rd Welland Canal, forcing them open by six inches. The resulting surge of water flooded downstream, cresting the upstream gates of Lock No. 21 where five boys were fishing. One boy ran to safety and one of the boys was saved by a government surveyor. But the remaining three were knocked into the water, drowning in the surge.

On August 25, 1974, the northbound ore-carrier Steelton struck Bridge 12 in Port Robinson. The bridge was rising and the impact knocked the bridge over, destroying it. No one was killed. The bridge master, Albert Beaver, and a watchman on the ship suffered minor injuries. The bridge has not been replaced and the inhabitants of Port Robinson have been served by a ferry for many years. The Welland Public Library archive has images of the aftermath.

On August 11, 2001, the lake freighter Windoc collided with Bridge 11 in Allanburg, closing vessel traffic on the Welland Canal for two days. The accident destroyed the ship's wheelhouse and funnel (chimney), ignited a large fire on board, and caused minor damage to the vertical-lift bridge. The accident and portions of its aftermath were captured on amateur video.  The vessel was a total loss, but there were no reported injuries, and no pollution to the waterway. The damage to the bridge was focused on the centre of the vertical-lift span. It was repaired over a number of weeks and reopened to vehicular traffic on November 16, 2001. The Marine Investigation Report concluded, "it is likely that the [vertical-lift bridge] operator's performance was impaired while the bridge span was lowered onto the Windoc."

At around noon on Wednesday September 30, 2015, the Lena J cargo ship collided with Bridge 19 in Port Colborne, closing the bridge to all vehicle and pedestrian traffic until an assessment could be made on the condition of the bridge. The vessel had sustained damage to its bridge, but was still able to continue on its voyage to Burns Harbour, Indiana. Pictures of the damage sustained to the vessel and Bridge 19 were captured. On Friday October 1, 2015, Chris Lee, an acting direct engineer for the City of Port Colborne, said that the St. Lawrence Seaway Management Corporation (SLSMC) will likely close the bridge to all vehicle traffic until the end of the year. However, pedestrians will be able to cross the bridge, and emergency services will be able to cross the bridge on a limited basis. On Tuesday October 6, 2015, the City of Port Colborne released a media statement, which stated that Bridge 19, "will remain closed to vehicular traffic until after the close of the shipping season in December. Repairs will begin in early January." Detour routes have been planned and mapped by the City of Port Colborne and the City of Welland in order to ease the flow of traffic over Bridge 19A.

The Welland Canal Fallen Workers Memorial at Lock 3 was unveiled on November 12, 2017. This commemorates the 137 workers who died while building the canal.

On July 11, 2020 two cargo ships, the Alanis and the Florence Spirit, struck each other while executing a passing manoeuvre near Port Robinson. According to the St. Lawrence Seaway Management Corporation, no one was injured, no cargo was spilled, and an investigation would be undertaken.

Sabotage
The Welland Canal has been the focus of plots on a number of occasions throughout its existence. However, only two have ever been carried out. The earliest and potentially most devastating attack occurred on September 9, 1841, at Lock No. 37 (Allanburg) of the First Welland Canal (approximately 180 m north of today's Allanburg bridge), when an explosive charge destroyed one of the lock gates. However, a catastrophic flood was prevented when a guard gate located upstream of the lock closed into place preventing the upstream waters from careening down the route of the Canal and causing further damage and possible injury or loss of life. It was suspected that Benjamin Lett was responsible for the explosion.

On April 21, 1900, about 6:30 in the evening, a dynamite charge was set off against the hinges of Lock No. 24 of the Third Welland Canal (just to the east of Lock No. 7 of today's canal), doing minor damage. This time, the saboteurs were caught in nearby Thorold. John Walsh, John Nolan and the ringleader "Dynamite" Luke Dillon (a member of Clan-na-Gael) were tried at the Welland Courthouse and found guilty, receiving life sentences at Kingston Penitentiary. The "star witness" at the trial was a 16-year-old Thorold girl named Euphemia Constable, who caught a good look at the bombers before being knocked unconscious by the blast. While waiting to testify, the girl received death threats, but, they turned out to be a hoax. As for the prisoners, Nolan lost his sanity while incarcerated, John Walsh was eventually released while Luke Dillon remained in custody until July 12, 1914.

The First World War brought with it plots against the canal and the most notable of them came to be known as "The Von Papen Plot". In April 1916, a United States federal grand jury issued an indictment against Franz von Papen, Captain Hans Tauscher, Captain Karl Boy-Ed, Constantine Covani and Franz von Rintelen on charges of a plot to blow up the Welland Canal. However, Papen was at the time safely on German soil, having been expelled from the US several months previously for alleged earlier acts of espionage and attempted sabotage.

Von Papen remained under indictment on these charges until he became Chancellor of Germany in 1932, at which time the charges were dropped.

Shipping season
The canal regularly opens late March through December, with closure in the winter due to hazardous weather. On March 20, 2007, the record for the earliest season opening was broken, and matched the following year.

Facts and figures

Current canal
 Maximum vessel length: 
 Maximum vessel draft: 
 Maximum above-water clearance: 
 Elevation change between Lake Ontario and Lake Erie: 
 Average transit time between the lakes: 11 hours
 Length of canal:

Increasing lock size

List of locks and crossings
Locks and crossings are numbered from north to south.

Profile
The following illustration depicts the profile of the Welland Canal. The horizontal axis is the length of the canal. The vertical axis is the elevation of the canal segments above mean sea level.

Old alignment prior to Welland By-Pass relocation

† If assigned by the St. Lawrence Seaway Authority. The original bridges across the fourth canal were numbered in order. Numbering was not changed as bridges were removed.

See also 
Container on barge

References

External links

Wellandcanals.ca – Detailed phototours of all Four Welland Canals
Survey maps of the First and Second Welland Canals at Brock University
Official Seaway Schedule Page 
Official Seaway Traffic Map Page 
"New Inland Canal Rivals Panama", February 1931, Popular Science
The Old Welland Canals Field Guide
Exploring the Old Welland Canals (Google map)
Railway Maps (includes details of the Welland Realignment)
The Welland Canal Section of the St. Lawrence Seaway  (PDF)
Has information about Niagara Region bridges, including many Welland Canal Bridges. 
Welland Public Library archive of canal history images & clippings 
Images from the Historic Niagara Digital Collections
Art works from the collection of the Niagara Falls Public Library
"Windoc Bridge Accident." Youtube, 2006-09-30.
Al Miller, "Windoc Accident." 
The "Great Swivel Link": Canada's Welland Canal, a history of the canals published by the Champlain Society in 2000.
Welland Canal Records Brock University Library Digital Repository
Hamilton Merritt Welland Canal circular RG 506 Brock University Library Digital Repository
Sykes fonds Welland Canal Scrapbook RG 341 Brock University Library Digital Repository
Ivan S. Brookes fonds RG 182 Brock University Library Digital Repository

 
Ship canals
History of transport in Canada
Saint Lawrence Seaway
Canals in Ontario
Transport in Welland
Transport in St. Catharines
Canals opened in 1830
1830 establishments in Upper Canada